"Tales From The Hood" is a single by rapper Domino featuring Chill from the soundtrack to the 1995 horror film of the same name.

The song was the only charting single from the gold-certified soundtrack, making it to the Billboard's R&B and rap charts. A promotional music video was released that showed Domino and Chill performing the song in a club along with cuts of scenes from the film. Chill's group Compton's Most Wanted, actress Paula Jai Parker, E-40, MC Eiht, Ol' Dirty Bastard and director Rusty Cundieff make cameo appearances in the video.

Stetsasonic member Bobby Simmons produced the remix entitled the Pink Eye remix which appeared as the second track on the single. The single's B-side was the Kurupt-produced "I'm Talkin' to Myself", which is another track from the soundtrack, performed by NME and Grench the Mean 1.

The song was "chopped and screwed" and mixed by DJ Screw on the mixtape Diary of the Originator released in 1999.

Single track listing

A-Side
"Tales from the Hood" (LP Version)- 4:17
"Tales from the Hood" (Pink Eye remix)- 5:10

B-Side
"I'm Talkin' to Myself"- 5:14

Charts

1995 singles
Domino (rapper) songs
1995 songs
MCA Records singles